Wheeler County is the name of several counties in the United States:

 Wheeler County, Georgia
 Wheeler County, Nebraska
 Wheeler County, Oregon
 Wheeler County, Texas